Leucopogon interruptus is a species of flowering plant in the family Ericaceae and is endemic to the southwest of Western Australia. It is a spreading, glabrous shrub with oval to oblong leaves crowded at the ends of branches, and many small, white, tube-shaped flowers that are bearded inside.

Description
The flowers are arranged in interrupted spikes on the ends of branches with broad bracts and bracteoles less than half as long as the sepals.

Taxonomy
Leucopogon interruptus was first formally described in 1810 by Robert Brown in his Prodromus Florae Novae Hollandiae et Insulae Van Diemen. The specific epithet (interruptus) means "separated", referring to gaps in the flower spikes.

Distribution
This leucopogon grows in grey sand over granite in the Esperance Plains bioregion of south-western Western Australia.

References

interruptus
Ericales of Australia
Flora of Western Australia
Plants described in 1810
Taxa named by Robert Brown (botanist, born 1773)